Benjamín Barrera y Reyes (December 28, 1902 in Sensuntepeque, Cabañas – February 4, 1999 in Santa Ana) was a bishop from El Salvador.

Appointed in 1942 by Pope Pius XII Auxiliary Bishop of Santa Ana, became its bishop in 1954. He resigned on February 25, 1981.

He took part in all four sessions of the Second Vatican Council.

References 
Catholic-hierarchy.org

1902 births
1999 deaths
People from Sensuntepeque
Participants in the Second Vatican Council
20th-century Roman Catholic bishops in El Salvador
Roman Catholic bishops of Santa Ana